Per Hillestad (born 25 March 1959 in Øvre Årdal, Norway) is a Norwegian musician (drums) and record producer, known as drummer in Lava and was contributing in releases by a-ha, Vamp, Jonas Fjeld, Bjølsen Valsemølle and Marius Müller.

Career 
Hillestad founded "supergroup" Lava in Årdal 1977, together with Kjell Hestetun, Stein Eriksen and Svein Dag Hauge. From 1980 Lava released a series of albums receiving very good reviews. They were awarded Spellemannsprisen in 1984 for the album Fire, and has been nominated for the award several times. Lava has among others toured together with the vocalist Randy Crawford in Australia, Asia and Africa.

Hillestad also played on albums by Vigdis Eidsvåg (Mørk Og Mjuk 2000), D.D.E. (Vi E Konga 2003), Øystein Sunde (Sånn Er'e Bare 2005) and Jan Groth (2006).

Honors 
1984: Spellemannsprisen in the class Pop, within the band Lava
1995: Gammleng-prisen in the class Studio.

Discography (in selection) 

Within Lava
1980: Lava Single (Polydor Records)
1981: Cruisin (Polydor Records)
1982: Prime Time (Polydor Records)
1984: Fire (Polydor Records)
1985: Prime Cuts (Polydor Records)
1989: The Rhythm of Love (Mercury Records)
1993: The Very Best of Lava (Polydor Records), Compilation
2003: Polarity (Tylden & Co)
2005: Alibi (Tylden & Co)
2009: Symphonic Journey (Tylden & Co), live album with KORK

With Ketil Bjørnstad
1983: Aniara (Slagerfabrikken), rock opera
1991: Rift – En Rockopera (Hete Blikk)
1992: Messe For En Såret Jord (Kirkelig Kulturverksted)
1993: Water Stories (ECM Records), including Terje Rypdal, Jon Christensen & Bjørn Kjellemyr
1994: For Den Som Elsker (Kirkelig Kulturverksted), with lyrics by Stein Mehren performed by Frøydis Armand
1996: Haugtussa (Kirkelig Kulturverksted), with lyrics by Arne Garborg performed by Lynni Treekrem

With Silhouette
1984: Silhouette (RCA Victor), texts & music written by Philip A. Kruse & George Keller

With Øystein Sunde
1984: I Husbukkens Tegn (Spinner Records)
1986: Overbuljongterningpakkmesterassistent (Spinner Records)
1989: Kjekt Å Ha (Tomato Records)
1994: Du Må'kke Komme Her Og Komme Her (Philips Records)

With Lill Lindfors
1985: Människors Makt (Slagerfabrikken)

With Jonas Fjeld
1985: Neck'n Neck (CBS Records)
1989: Svært Nok For Meg (EMI Records)
1992: Texas Jensen (Stageway Records)

With Act
1985: September Field (Odeon)

With Vindél
1986: Perfect Crime (Bahama Records)

With Marius Müller's Funhouse
1991: Maximum (Second Hand Records)
1995: Mia's Song Single (Sonet Records)
2009: Plugged 2 – Rett Og Slett (Slagerfabrikken)

With Sissel Kyrkjebø
1987: Sissel (Noahs Ark)
1994: Se Ilden Lyse (Forenede Fonogramprodusenter)

With Doxa
1987: Noe Som Spirer (Scan Music), feat. Sigurd Køhn

With Anne Grete Preus
1988: Fullmåne (Warner Music Norway)

With Rita Eriksen
1988: Back From Wonderland (Desperado Records)

With Egil Eldøen
1988: Here We Go Again (Sonet Records)

With Fra Lippo Lippi
1989: The Colour Album (The Record Station)
2011: Fra Lippo Lippi (Rune Arkiv), Compilation

With Dag Lauvland
1989: 1 Step Closer (WEA)

With Hans-Inge Fagervik
1989: Painted Pictures (My Own Records)

With Hanne Krogh
1989: Hanne (Sonet Records)

With a-ha
1990: East of the Sun, West of the Moon (Warner Bros. Records)
1993: Memorial Beach (Warner Bros. Records)
2000: Minor Earth Major Sky (Warner Bros. Records)

With Dag Kolsrud
1990: December (RCA Records)

With Bjørn Eidsvåg
1990: Tatt Av Vinden (Norsk Plateproduksjon)

With Lynni Treekrem
1991: Ut I Vind (Columbia Records)

With Morten Harket
1992: Poetenes Evangelium (Kirkelig Kulturverksted)

With Yellow Pages
1992: Her Story (EMI Records)

With Animal Farm
1994: Animal Farm (Norsk Plateproduksjon)

With Anne Grimstad Fjeld
2000: Tein (Anchi Litt Av Hvert...)

With Svein Tang Wa
2005: På Kanten (Trembling Records)

With Jonnys Daughter
2005: Happy Blue Year (Nobel Records)

With Kristin Sevaldsen & The Millionairs
2011: Transit (d'Label Records)

References 

1943 births
Living people
Musicians from Årdal
ECM Records artists
20th-century Norwegian drummers
21st-century Norwegian drummers
Norwegian jazz drummers
Male drummers
Spellemannprisen winners
20th-century drummers
20th-century Norwegian male musicians
21st-century Norwegian male musicians
Male jazz musicians
Lava (band) members